"Love Her" is a song written by Barry Mann and Cynthia Weil which was first a song for the American singing duo The Everly Brothers in 1963 as the b-side to "The Girl Sang the Blues" and was later recorded and released by the American pop group The Walker Brothers as their second single in 1965.  Doris Day released a lyrical variation entitled "Love Him" for her 1963 album of the same name.

The Walker Brothers' version is notable as it is the first single the group recorded with Scott Walker as the lead singer. Previously, John Walker was the main vocalist. The song was produced by Nick Venet and arranged by Phil Spector collaborator Jack Nitzsche, who gave the song a Wall of Sound treatment. "Love Her" became the group's first hit, spending thirteen weeks on the UK Singles Chart and peaking at #20 in June.

In 1971, the song was re-issued in the UK with the group's two UK #1 singles, The Sun Ain't Gonna Shine Anymore and Make It Easy on Yourself, as b-sides. The re-issued single did not chart.

Track listing

Chart positions

References

1965 singles
The Walker Brothers songs
Songs written by Barry Mann
Songs with lyrics by Cynthia Weil
1963 songs
The Everly Brothers songs
Song recordings with Wall of Sound arrangements
Smash Records singles
Philips Records singles
Song recordings produced by Nick Venet